The Water Avenue Historic District is a  historic district in Selma, Dallas County, Alabama.  It is centered on Water Avenue in downtown.  The boundaries were increased on July 7, 2005.  The district is primarily commercial, with examples of the Greek Revival, Italianate, Queen Anne, Romanesque Revival, and Renaissance Revival styles.  It contains 52 properties, with 47 contributing and 5 noncontributing to the district.  It was added to the National Register of Historic Places on December 26, 1972, with boundary increases in 2005 and 2021.

References

External links

National Register of Historic Places in Dallas County, Alabama
Historic districts in Dallas County, Alabama
Historic American Buildings Survey in Alabama
Historic districts on the National Register of Historic Places in Alabama
Selma, Alabama